Elise Bauman (born October 23, 1990) is a Canadian actress, director, filmmaker and singer. She portrayed the role of Laura Hollis, the lead character of the web series Carmilla (2014–2016).

Career
Bauman began working professionally in the theatre from an early age. In 2009, she made the move to New York City to further her studies by attending Circle in the Square Theatre School, where she was cast as Anya in the graduating classes' production of The Cherry Orchard. In the fall, she returned to the stage once again in Red One Theatre Collective’s The Skriker, by Caryl Churchill, which garnered rave reviews and was rated 5 N’s in NOW Magazine.

In 2014, Bauman was cast as the lead character Laura Hollis, the naive and headstrong student of Silas University, in the Canadian web series Carmilla, based on the 1871 Gothic vampire novella of the same name by J. Sheridan Le Fanu.

The series has become popular online for its depiction of LGBT characters and has been viewed over 70 million times on the KindaTV YouTube channel, attracting fans worldwide. When interviewed about how she feels playing a queer character in a series that isn't about being queer, Bauman said:You don’t see any of the characters being ostracized because of it [their sexuality]. In a way, it’s exactly the opposite of what happens on other shows. Their sexuality isn’t the thing that is sticking out about them. It’s the norm. I think that is so refreshing and that it is so wonderful to see...

As a result of Carmilla's popularity online, Bauman has garnered much attention on social media for her role, primarily on Tumblr, Twitter, and Instagram, where she has since amassed more than 200,000 combined followers. The show's popularity helped her secure the 9th position on AfterEllen's Hot 100 List in 2015.

In 2016, Bauman starred alongside her Carmilla co-star Natasha Negovanlis in the feature film Almost Adults, directed by Sarah Rotella and written by Adrianna DiLonardo from Unsolicited Projects. Almost Adults was screened at several film festivals before being made available on multiple online platforms, including Netflix, in 2017.

Installments of the third and final season of Carmilla began airing on YouTube in September 2016. During that same year, the series won a Canadian Screen Award and a Rockie Award for Branded Content at the Banff World Media Festival.

In 2017, Bauman reprised her role as Laura Hollis in The Carmilla Movie, a feature-length film based on the series, which was released in theatres across Canada on October 26.

In 2018, At the 6th Canadian Screen Awards, Bauman won the Cogeco Fund  Audience Choice Award, voted on by fans, for her work on Carmilla. Bauman states in her speech, "The entertainment industry is changing but not rapidly enough, and we need the voices of the public to prove that diverse stories will have a large and dedicated audience. If we want to see films and shows with inclusive representation both in front of and behind the camera, we need to support those projects. So my ask of you is this; one, seek out and watch projects made by and starring women, people of colour and LGBTQ people. Signal boost these projects to your network of friends. I believe we have the power to change the way we tell our stories and I believe that you, the audience, plays a significant role in that change.  Let’s get to it.  Thank you!"

In 2018, Bauman made her directorial debut with Canadian musician Ellevan's music video "Keep Going".

Personal life
Bauman came out as bisexual in 2017.

Filmography

Other Work

Music

Music videos

Behind-the-Scenes

Awards

References

External links

21st-century Canadian actresses
Canadian film actresses
Circle in the Square Theatre School alumni
Canadian musical theatre actresses
Canadian television actresses
Canadian LGBT rights activists
Canadian feminists
Feminist filmmakers
Actresses from Kitchener, Ontario
Canadian web series actresses
Living people
Bisexual actresses
Bisexual singers
Canadian LGBT actors
1990 births
Feminist musicians
Canadian LGBT singers
21st-century Canadian LGBT people